The Regong arts (or Rebgong arts) are the popular arts on the subject of Tibetan Buddhism.  They are painting, sculpture, engraving, architecture, and embroidery. They are associated with communities in Tongren County and along the river Rongwo which crosses the current Huangnan Tibetan Autonomous Prefecture in the province of Qinghai in China.

Regong arts were included in 2009 on the representative list of intangible cultural heritage.

History

Regong arts trace their origins to the 10th century

Different Regong arts 
 The thangka, also called "tangka", "thanka", or "tanka" (pronunciation), literally something which is unrolled, is a painting on canvas characteristic of Tibetan culture. Canvases of all sizes can be found, from thangka portraits which can be unrolled due to two sticks passing through eyelets, up to momentous designed to be unrolled to cover a wall or door, which can measure dozens of metres. The thangkas generally represent mystic symbols (mandala), divinities of Tibetan Buddhism or Bon, or portraits of the Dalai Lama. They are often used as support for meditation. 
 The Dui tapestries (duixiu) or barbola are pictures of animals and plants, decorated on silk, which creates a relief. These can be used to decorate columns or on walls. 
 Regong sculptures can be made of clay, wood, stone or brick, and decorate temples and homes; mural panels, furniture, or tables for serving tea.

Notes and references

See also

Linked articles 
 Tibetan culture
 Tibetan art

Amdo
Huangnan Tibetan Autonomous Prefecture
Tibetan Buddhist art and culture
Tibetan painting
Cultural heritage of China